Zoe Voris (born December 4, 1998) is an American wheelchair basketball player and a member of the United States women's national wheelchair basketball team. She represented the United States at the 2020 Summer Paralympics.

Career
Voris represented the United States at the 2020 Summer Paralympics in the wheelchair basketball women's tournament and won a bronze medal.

References

1998 births
Living people
People with spina bifida
Basketball players from Chicago
American women's wheelchair basketball players
Paralympic wheelchair basketball players of the United States
Wheelchair basketball players at the 2020 Summer Paralympics
Medalists at the 2020 Summer Paralympics
Paralympic bronze medalists for the United States
Paralympic medalists in wheelchair basketball
21st-century American women
20th-century American women